The Henry Ebeling House is a historic building located in the West End of Davenport, Iowa, United States. Henry Ebeling, a local contractor was the first person to live in the house in 1888. He more than likely built it as well. The two-story house features a cross-gable plan, a polygonal bay window on the east side, and it has two additions made to the back. While some of the architectural details are now missing from the house, one can still see some of them on the front porch. The Late Victorian style residence has been listed on the National Register of Historic Places since 1984.

References

Houses completed in 1888
Victorian architecture in Iowa
Houses in Davenport, Iowa
Houses on the National Register of Historic Places in Iowa
National Register of Historic Places in Davenport, Iowa
1888 establishments in Iowa